The Chinese Ambassador to São Tomé and Príncipe is the official representative of the People's Republic of China to the Democratic Republic of São Tomé and Príncipe.

List of representatives

See also
China–São Tomé and Príncipe relations

References 

 
São Tomé and Príncipe
China